Ranarama (also Rana Rama) is a top-down Gauntlet-like action game developed by Graftgold and published by Hewson Consultants in 1987. It was released for the Amstrad CPC, Atari ST, Commodore 64 and ZX Spectrum home computers. The title appears to be a pun on rana, a genus of frogs. The game concept is similar to a previous game by Steve Turner for the ZX Spectrum called Quazatron, which was itself inspired by Paradroid, created by Turner's Graftgold colleague Andrew Braybrook.

In 2004 it was featured as one of the games on the C64 Direct-to-TV.

Plot
The main character is Mervyn, a sorcerer's apprentice whose botched spell turns him into a frog just in time to save him from an invasion of evil magic-users who slay his mentors. Mervyn's arcane capabilities are intact, and the game's aim is to hunt down the attackers.

Gameplay

Mervyn has four types of magic and eight increasingly potent and power-consuming spells for each: Offensive spells serve as projectile weaponry, defensive spells reduce damage etc., effect spells activate special abilities or act as area-effect attacks, power spells fuel the other kinds. The first three are usable indefinitely, but power spells degrade with damage and with a constant drain caused by the other spells that can vary from minimal to vast depending on supply and demand. They drop to level one on expiration; expiring on that level is lethal and ends the game. Commonly found energy crystals replenish some power.

The game is set in a dungeon split into eight levels that are freely traversable (but not necessarily immediately survivable), each of which is split into a labyrinthine network of rooms and houses some benevolent glyphs, 12 hostile wizards, hordes of monsters and monster generators. Rooms are not visible before they are entered, and their inhabitants only from within. Monsters cause damage by contact, attack en masse and fall easily, while wizards are much tougher and use attack spells. The latter can be defeated by attacks, but contact with them triggers a sub-game of unscrambling the mixed up word "RANARAMA" within a strict time limit. Failure expires the current power spell, but victory destroys the wizard and scatters four runes that can be used at Glyphs of Sorcery to change spells. On average there need to be 7.5 switchings of the letters. The starting positions which require the maximum of 16 switchings of the letters are "MAAAARRN" and "MAAAANRR".

Reception

Crash gave the Spectrum version an overall score of 90%, calling it an "innovative" Gauntlet clone. Computer + Video Games gave the Commodore 64 version an overall score of 8.5 out of ten, stating that the game requires "a high degree of strategy".

References

External links
 
 Ranarama at Atari Mania
 

1987 video games
Action video games
Amstrad CPC games
Atari ST games
Commodore 64 games
Fictional frogs
Graftgold games
Single-player video games
Top-down video games
Video games about amphibians
Video games about shapeshifting
Video games about witchcraft
Video games developed in the United Kingdom
ZX Spectrum games
Hewson Consultants games